Christa Peters (1933–1981) was a German fashion photographer.

Peters worked for many magazines, including Twen, Der Spiegel, Stern, Praline, Vogue, and Nova.

In 1966, she teamed up with her future husband, fellow photographer Chadwick Hall. After her death from a "serious disease" and suffering from grief, Hall burnt her entire archive.

References

1933 births
1981 deaths
Photographers from Cologne
Fashion photographers